Kung Ako'y Iiwan Mo (International title: Without You / ) is a 2012 Philippine melodrama romantic television series directed by Lino S. Cayetano, Manny Q. Palo, Jojo A. Saguin, and Avel E. Sunpongco. The series stars Jake Cuenca, Shaina Magdayao, Bangs Garcia, and Ron Morales, with an ensemble cast consisting of  Sandy Andolong, Gloria Diaz, Maria Isabel Lopez, Dick Israel, Liza Soberano, Aaron Junatas, Nikki Valdez, Jojit Lorenzo, Ronnie Lazaro, Dianne Medina, Alyanna Angeles, Jillian Aguila, Joross Gamboa, and Dexie Daulat in their supporting roles. The series premiered on ABS-CBN's Kapamilya Gold afternoon block and worldwide on TFC, replacing Angelito: Batang Ama and was replaced by A Gentleman's Dignity from April 16 to November 16, 2012.

Overview
The story revolves on the lives of two former childhood friend turned lovers whose destinies pave way through their marriage and try to pave their way of difficult lives as Overseas Filipino Worker (OFW) just to provide for them a better life as a married couple and as a family.

Premise
The story revolves on fate, and the lives of OFW's making an everyday living to make ends meet in dreams of a better life.

Paul (Jake Cuenca) and Sarah (Shaina Magdayao) are OFW-Workers whose fathers served as inspirations to achieve their goals in life throughout their lives their fates will be tested and must face the same obstacles from the past their parents faced emotionally and physically and when trust comes into the picture their love will be at stake with Mia (Bangs Garcia) Paul's former girlfriend will also fight for love as well. Mia and Paul's infidelity  creates major problems in the end for both of their families and Sarah finds out Mia is pregnant but also is too pregnant with Paul's child which causes the ladder to put both Mia and Paul's lives at stakes when they both end up in bars and with Sarah coming home to the Philippines will this relationship end in a failed marriage or will their love for one another protect their once happily relationship? With all the hardships they've gone and they're going through, they are trying their best to prove the world that love can forgive and forget, and that love can totally change someone. Their off and on relationship is hopefully heading to happiness, leaving off the sick and obsessed Mia, and with the help of the weakling Rino.

Cast and characters

Main cast
Shaina Magdayao as Sarah Natividad-Raymundo
Jake Cuenca as Paulino "Paul" Raymundo
Bangs Garcia as Mia Pedroso†
 Ron Morales as Rino De Dios†

Supporting cast
Sandy Andolong as Belen Natividad
Gloria Diaz as Elvie Raymundo
Maria Isabel Lopez as Sonia Pedroso†
Dick Israel as Arturo "Atoy" Pedroso
Hope Soberano as Claire Raymundo
Aaron Junatas as Rap Raymundo
Nikki Valdez as Joy
Jojit Lorenzo as George
Ronnie Lazaro as Cito
Dianne Medina as Sandra
Alyanna Angeles as Faith Raymundo
Jillian Aguila as Macy Raymundo 
Joross Gamboa as Edward Santiago
Dexie Daulat as Samantha "Sam" Santiago

Guest cast
Isay Alvarez as Cynthia Reyes†
Eva Darren as Almira
Lui Manansala as Minda
Nanding Josef as Eddie
Tiya Pusit as Conchita
Xavi Hemady as Chris
Nikki Bagaporo as Karen
Ryan Bang as Leo
Ivan Dorschner as Mark
Johan Santos as Michael
David Chua as Juan

Special participation
Christopher de Leon as Manny Raymundo†
Phillip Salvador as Roman Natividad†
Paul Salas as Young Paul Raymundo
Mariel Pamintuan as Young Sarah Natividad
Clarence Delgado as Young Rap Raymundo

International broadcast
: TodayTV VTC7 (December 19, 2013, entitled Định mệnh anh và em)

See also
List of programs broadcast by ABS-CBN
List of telenovelas of ABS-CBN

References

External links

ABS-CBN drama series
Television series by Dreamscape Entertainment Television
2012 Philippine television series debuts
2012 Philippine television series endings
Philippine melodrama television series
Philippine romance television series
Filipino-language television shows
Television shows filmed in the Philippines
Television shows filmed in Qatar
Television shows filmed in the United Arab Emirates